Opatovice nad Labem is a municipality and village in Pardubice District in the Pardubice Region of the Czech Republic. It has about 2,700 inhabitants.

Administrative parts

The village of Pohřebačka is an administrative part of Opatovice nad Labem.

Etymology
The name Opatovice is derived from opatství, i.e. "abbey". It indicated a village in the vicinity of the monastery that was founded here.

Geography
It lies in a flat landscape of the East Elbe Table lowland. It is situated on the right bank of the Elbe river. There are several flooded quarries used for recreational purposes. The largest of them is Opaťák in the northern part of the municipality.

The Opatovice Canal flows through the village. It was built in the 15th century to supply the large pond system and is a cultural technical monument.

History
Archaeological research confirmed that mild climate and fertile surroundings of the Elbe had been exploited by ancient peoples. The first written mention of Opatovice nad Labem is from 1073, when Benedictine monks founded here a monastery. The Opatovice Monastery was finished in 1086 and existed until 1421, when it was burned down by the Hussites.

In the 15th century, the village was shortly owned by Diviš Bořek of Miletínek and by George of Poděbrady, and in 1491, it was acquired by the Pernštejn family. The Pernštejns built here the first weir on the Elbe and the Opatovice Canal to feed the system of breeding fish ponds. In 1560, however, they lost the manor for financial reasons and it was acquired by the royal chamber. During the Thirty Years' War, Opatovice was looted by the Swedish army.

Economy

Opatovice nad Labem is known for its large power station that was first activated in 1959.

Transport
The municipality is known for commissioning one of the largest road junctions in the country.

Sights
The Church of Saint Lawrence was built in the Gothic style in the second half of the 13th century and rebuilt in 1421. The current appearance is after the Baroque reconstructions in the second half of the 18th century.

Notable people
Emanuela Nohejlová-Prátová (1900–1995), numismatist, archaeologist and historian

References

External links

Villages in Pardubice District